Lilly Mills (born 2 January 2001) is an Australian cricketer who plays as an off spin bowler for Western Australia in the Women's National Cricket League (WNCL) and Perth Scorchers in the Women's Big Bash League (WBBL).

Mills played in one match for Brisbane Heat in the 2019–20 Women's Big Bash League season. Her opportunities with the Heat were limited, as the team had a strong list of spin bowlers. She made her debut for Queensland against NSW at the end of the 2020–21 season, when Queensland captain Jess Jonassen left for Australia's tour of New Zealand. A week later, she took 3/36, including the key wicket of Elyse Villani, in the final against Victoria.

In her subsequent debut for the Scorchers against the Heat on 17 October 2021, Mills took another key wicket by bowling Jonassen, and also dismissed Mikayla Hinkley. The Scorchers' captain, Sophie Devine, then entrusted Mills with bowling the final over of the Heat's innings. During that over, Mills took a further wicket to finish with 3/28, and the Heat was only able to tie the score. The Scorchers then prevailed in the Super Over tiebreaker.

References

External links

Lilly Mills at Cricket Australia

2001 births
Living people
Australian women cricketers
Brisbane Heat (WBBL) cricketers
Queensland Fire cricketers
Place of birth missing (living people)
Perth Scorchers (WBBL) cricketers
Western Australia women cricketers